Set Your Goals may refer to:

 Set Your Goals (band), an American rock band
 Set Your Goals (album), an album by CIV